Carlo Galetti (26 August 1882 – 2 April 1949) was an Italian professional road racing cyclist.

He was born at Corsico. The highlight of his career was his three consecutive overall wins in the 1910, 1911 and 1912 Giros d'Italia, the last of which was won as part of Team Atala along with Giovanni Micheletto and Eberardo Pavesi.

He died in Milan in 1949.

Major results

1904 
1st Campionato Brianzola
1st Menaggio–Como–Lecco–Menaggio
2nd Dongo–Gera–Dongo

1905 
1st Campionato Brianzola
3rd Coppa Desio
3rd Legnano–Gravellona–Legnano
3rd Coppa Morbegno

1906 
1st Overall Milano–Bologna–Roma
1st Stage 2
1st Roma–Napoli–Roma
1st Gran Fondo, La Seicento Corza Nazionale
2nd Giro di Lombardia
2nd Coppa Val d'Olona
3rd Milano–Giovi–Milano
3rd Milano–Pontedecimo
3rd Brescia–Milano–Pallanza

1907 
1st Overall Giro di Sicilia
1st Stages 1, 3, 4, 6 & 8
1st Firenze–Roma
2nd Corsa Regina Madre
2nd Milano–Bergamo–Como
2nd Milano–Bologna–Firenze
2nd Giro del Piemonte

1908 
1st Overall Giro di Sicilia
1st Stages 1, 3 & 6
1st Corsa Vittorio Emanuele III e Regina Madre
1st Coppa Tradate
2nd Road Race, National Road Championships
2nd Gran Fondo, La Seicento Corza Nazionale
2nd Coppa Savona
2nd Tre Coppe Parabiago
3rd Giro del Piemonte

1909 
2nd Overall Giro d'Italia
2nd Tre Coppe Parabiago
2nd Coppa Savona
3rd Coppa Bastogi
7th Milan–San Remo

1910 
1st Overall Giro d'Italia
1st Stages 3 & 8
1st Overall Ai mari ai laghi ai monti
1st Stages 4 & 8
1st Tre Coppe Parabiago
2nd Giro di Romagna-Toscana
3rd Overall Roma–Napoli–Roma

1911 
1st Overall Giro d'Italia
1st Stages 1, 4 & 10
1st Tre Coppe Parabiago
2nd Overall Roma–Napoli–Roma
2nd Giro del Piemonte
4th Milan–San Remo

1912 
1st Overall Giro d'Italia
1st Stage 5
1st Milano–Sesto San Giovanni Chrono
2nd Gran Fondo, La Seicento Corza Nazionale
10th Milan–San Remo

1913 
8th Giro di Lombardia

1914 
2nd Milan–San Remo

1915
4th Milan–San Remo

1918 
1st Overall Milano–Bologna–Roma
1st Stage 2
3rd Giro di Lombardia

1919 
1st National Track Championships, Individual Pursuit
2nd Gran Fondo, La Seicento Corza Nazionale
5th Milan–San Remo

1920 
2nd Overall Giro della Provincia Milano

1921 
9th Milan–San Remo

References

1882 births
1949 deaths
Cyclists from the Metropolitan City of Milan
Italian male cyclists
Giro d'Italia winners
Italian Giro d'Italia stage winners